Dr. Robert Don Hughes (born 1949), is an American educator, writer, and pastor. He has authored mainstream fantasy and science fiction and evangelical non-fiction.

Education
Hughes received his B.A. from California Baptist College, his M.Div. from Golden Gate Baptist Theological Seminary, and his Ph.D. from the Southern Baptist Theological Seminary, also studying at the University of Redlands.

Educational career
Hughes was formerly employed at the Southern Baptist Theological Seminary in Louisville, Kentucky, as associate vice president for external programs and associate professor of communication and mass media. Later he was a professor of missions and evangelism at Clear Creek Baptist Bible College. He retired from Pastoral ministry in 2019. His last pastorate was East Jellico Missionary Baptist Church in Pineville, Ky. He has also worked as a missionary in Africa.

Literary works
Hughes' fiction tends to deal seriously with religious themes, particularly in The Fallen and its sequel The Eternity Gene. Of his non-fiction, Satan's Whispers has the distinction of having been adopted for use by the Billy Graham Evangelistic Association.

Hughes' most extended body of work consists of his two fantasy sequences about a magical country split into three states by a two-headed dragon's occupation of the mountain pass linking each region with the others. As a result, the magical potential of each region has developed differently. The "Pelmen the Powershaper" trilogy tells of the end of the dragon's reign and its consequences; The unfinished "Wizard and Dragon" sequence, also projected as a trilogy, is set earlier in the country's history and deals with how the dragon was originally created.

Hughes' powerfully imagined dragon Vicia-Heinox with its two bickering heads has set a pattern for the portrayal of similar creatures in other media, including the animated film Quest for Camelot (1998) and the public television children's program Dragon Tales (1999-2005).

Bibliography

Fantasy

Pelmen the Powershaper
 The Prophet of Lamath (1979)
 The Wizard in Waiting (1982)
 The Power and the Prophet (1985)

Wizard and Dragon
 The Forging of the Dragon (1989)
 The Faithful Traitor (1992)

Short fiction
 "Pursuit of a Lost Tugolith: A Tale of Pelmen Before the Dragon Was Divided" (1983)

Science Fiction

The Fallen
 The Fallen: A Novel (1995)
 The Eternity Gene (1999)

Other
 Gabriel's Trumpet (1993)

Non-fiction 
 Plays That'll Preach (1985)
 A Real Live Missionary (1990)
 Talking to the World in the Days to Come (1991)
 Satan's Whispers: Breaking the Lies That Bind (1992)
 Questioning God (2002)
 History: Think for Yourself About What Shaped the Church (2008)

External links
 
Bibliography

1949 births
American fantasy writers
American science fiction writers
Living people
20th-century American novelists
California Baptist University alumni
Golden Gate Baptist Theological Seminary alumni
Southern Baptist Theological Seminary alumni
University of Redlands alumni
American male novelists
20th-century American male writers
20th-century American non-fiction writers
American male non-fiction writers